Jeanty is a surname. Notable people with the name include:

Georges Jeanty, American comic book penciler illustrator 
Osvaldo Jeanty (born 1983), Canadian basketball coach and player
Rashad Jeanty (born 1983), American football linebacker
Val Jeanty, Haitian electronic music artist